That's My Work 5 is a mixtape by American rap group Tha Dogg Pound. The mixtape is hosted by DJ Drama. It was released free for digital download on September 18, 2014 and includes 16 songs.

Track listing

References 

Debut mixtape albums
2014 mixtape albums
Tha Dogg Pound albums